The Indiana Harbor Belt Railroad  is a Class III railroad in the United States.

Ownership
The IHB is jointly owned by Conrail Shared Assets Operations (51%) and Canadian Pacific Railway (49%). These shareholders trace their ownership stake in IHB to previous mergers and acquisitions in the railroad industry.  Conrail's ownership is traced back to the Penn Central Transportation Company and prior to that, the New York Central Railroad and Pennsylvania Railroad.  Canadian Pacific's ownership is through its subsidiary, the Soo Line, which inherited it from the Chicago, Milwaukee, St. Paul and Pacific Railroad (also known as the "Milwaukee Road"). Also, the IHB's northern terminus is the Milwaukee District/West Line in Franklin Park, Illinois, which is operated by Metra and Canadian Pacific.

Route and facilities

The railroad's largest yard is Blue Island located in Riverdale, Illinois.  The Gibson Yard, located in Hammond, Indiana, is arguably the largest automobile traffic switching operation in the United States.  Other yards include Burnham, Calumet City, Alsip, Argo, LaGrange, Rose, Norpaul, Whiting, Michigan Avenue, and Lakefront.

Since the 1970s, the IHB has operated an extensive interlocking tower system including: East End, Osbourne, Calumet, State Line, Gibson, Stewart Avenue, Graselli, 55th Street and Argo towers. Switch tenders are located at North Harvey and Columbia Avenue. IHB also took over State Line tower from the Chicago and Western Indiana Railroad.

See also

Indiana Harbor Belt Railroad Co. v. American Cyanamid Co., a landmark torts case which involved the railroad.

References

External links

Indiana Harbor Belt Railroad
 RAILChicago - Chicago RAILExperts
 Indiana Harbor Belt Archive (railfan site)
 Shortlines of Chicago Historical Society  IHB History

Illinois railroads
Indiana railroads
Transportation in Gary, Indiana
Rail cooperatives
Switching and terminal railroads
Railroads in the Chicago metropolitan area